Joseph Dunne (8 June 1914 – 11 November 2014) was a sergeant in the Irish Guards who was awarded the Distinguished Conduct Medal and the Arctic Star.

References

1914 births
2014 deaths
Recipients of the Distinguished Conduct Medal
Irish Guards soldiers
British Army personnel of World War II
People from County Wexford